Imah Dumagay (born Fatimah Dumagay) is GCC's first Filipina stand-up comedian based in Dubai, UAE.

Life and Career 
Imah was born and raised in Cotabato City, Philippines. In 2008, she moved to Dubai where she now works as stand-up comedian, actor, and producer. She worked two years as advertising assistant, four years in the bank debt and recovery and nine years of experience as an executive assistant before she finally decided to leave the nine-to-five job in March 2021 to focus on her comedy. In 2018, she joined a comedy workshop at Dubai comedy school Dubomedy and began her career as a stand up comedian. She co-founded Comedy Kix, a popular comedy club that runs weekly shows in various venues in Dubai. 

Imah has opened for Indian comedians Zakir Khan, Anuradha Menon, and Anshu Mor. She was also featured in Dubai Global Comedy Fest 2018, where she has performed with Kenny Blaq, Basketmouth, and Eric Omondi.  She has also worked with UAE's popular comedians Mina Liccione, Ali Al Sayed, and Nitin Mirani.

In November 2020, Imah performed her first sold-out comedy special, Imah's Day Off, at one of the major entertainment venues in Dubai, The Theatre, Mall of the Emirates. 

In March 2021, Imah performed another hour-length show, The Shelarious Imah at The Theatre, Mall of the Emirates.

She was also one of the acts featured in Dubai Comedy Festival in May 2021. In September 2021 she performed her third show, IMAH: A Dose of Laughter at The Theatre, Mall of the Emirates in Dubai.

References

External links
 

Living people
Filipino women comedians
Year of birth missing (living people)
People from Cotabato City
Filipino expatriates in the United Arab Emirates